<noinclude>

Linha de Guimarães is a railway in Portugal operated by Comboios de Portugal. It runs between Porto and Guimarães; until 1986 it extended eastwards to Fafe. It was extensively modernised in the 2000s, including conversion from metre gauge to Iberian gauge track and electrification.

Narrow gauge line

The  gauge line from Lousado to Guimarães opened in 1884 and was extended to Fafe in 1907. From 1938 trains started operating the entirety of the route via a new link from Trindade station in Porto through to Fafe. The section between Guimarães and Fafe was closed in 1986 and the track lifted. Narrow gauge services on the Guimarães line ended in 2002 (for conversion to ). The terminus in Porto was Trindade station, which was closed in 2001 and subsequently rebuilt for use by the Porto Metro. The first few kilometres of the Guimarães line from Trindade has been rebuilt to become line C of the Porto Metro.

Broad gauge line
In 2004 Guimarães was one of the venues for the UEFA Euro 2004 football championship. Considerable investment was needed to bring the Guimarães line up to modern standards for carrying the expected numbers of visitors. Accordingly, the line was completely rebuilt as a  gauge line, with 25 kV / 50 Hz overhead wire electrification. The former line east of Guimarães to Fafe remained closed.

Upon modernisation in 2004, the former Porto terminus at Trindade station was closed (and has since been completely rebuilt to become a station on the Porto Metro). The former section of line between Porto Trindade station and Lousado was closed; trains to/from Guimarães now operate between Lousado and Porto via the Linha do Minho. Most Guimarães trains now terminate at Porto São Bento.

See also
List of gauge conversions
List of railway lines in Portugal
List of Portuguese locomotives and railcars
History of rail transport in Portugal

Railway lines in Portugal
Metre gauge railways in Portugal
Railway lines opened in 1884
Iberian gauge railways